Jarosławiec Lighthouse (Polish: Latarnia Morska Jarosławiec) is a lighthouse located on the Polish coast of the Baltic Sea. The lighthouse is located in Jarosławiec, West Pomeranian Voivodeship; in Poland.

The lighthouse is located in between the Darłowo (15 km to the west), and the lighthouse in Ustka.

History 
The lighthouse in Jarosławiec is the oldest lighthouse in Poland. Its construction began in 1835 however the lighthouse was not successful due to a number of physical factors. The lighthouse was built about 400 metres from the coast – this proved to be too low to be effective for navigation. Its light was not very visible because it was obscured by trees and it was soon decided to build a new tower closer to the beach. The new lighthouse began operating in 1838. Its light source was fifteen lamps powered by rapeseed oil. This unusual form of lighting was used for a long time until it was replaced at the beginning of the 20th century with electric lighting. The lighthouse is part of a complex of buildings, including the operator's living quarters, the lighthouse is 33.3 m in height. The light is located at a height of 50.2m above sea level and with a range of 23 nautical miles. The lighthouse, located in Jaroslawiec is a characteristic of the village – open to tourists. Nearby there is also the preserved and renovated formerly used lighthouse.

Technical data 
 Light characteristic
 Light: 0.45 s.
 Darkness: 2.05 s.
 Light: 0.45 s.
 Darkness: 6.05 s.
 Period: 9 s.

See also 

 List of lighthouses in Poland

References

External links 

 Urząd Morski w Słupsku  

Lighthouses completed in 1829
Resort architecture in Pomerania
Lighthouses in Poland
Tourist attractions in West Pomeranian Voivodeship